New York State Route 181  may refer to:
New York State Route 181 (1930–1939) in Jefferson County, from Clayton to Theresa
New York State Route 181 (1960–1963) also in Jefferson County, from Pamelia to Le Ray